Ross Furnace is a historic iron furnace located at Fairfield Township, Westmoreland County, Pennsylvania. It was built in 1842, and is a stone structure measuring 25 feet square at the base and 30 feet high.  It has a triangular work arch and Roman blast arch.  It remained in blast until about 1850–1855.

It was added to the National Register of Historic Places in 1991.

References

Industrial buildings and structures on the National Register of Historic Places in Pennsylvania
Industrial buildings completed in 1842
Buildings and structures in Westmoreland County, Pennsylvania
National Register of Historic Places in Westmoreland County, Pennsylvania
1842 establishments in Pennsylvania